Joe Kavanagh (born 27 February 1973) is an Irish sportsperson. He played Gaelic football with his local club Nemo Rangers and was a member of the Cork senior inter-county team from 1992 until 2002.  His brother, Derek Kavanagh, also played football with Cork.

References

1973 births
Living people
Nemo Rangers Gaelic footballers
Cork inter-county Gaelic footballers
Munster inter-provincial Gaelic footballers